The men's Greco-Roman featherweight was one of thirteen wrestling events held as part of the wrestling at the 1928 Summer Olympics programme. The competition was held from August 2 to 5, and featured 20 wrestlers from 20 nations.

Competition format

This Greco-Roman wrestling competition introduced an elimination system based on the accumulation of points. Each round featured all wrestlers pairing off and wrestling one bout (with one wrestler having a bye if there were an odd number). The loser received 3 points. The winner received 1 point if the win was by decision and 0 points if the win was by fall. At the end of each round, any wrestler with at least 5 points was eliminated.

Results

Round 1

The first round produced 7 winners by fall (0 points), 3 winners by decision (1 point), and 10 losers (3 points). Milovančev withdrew after his bout.

 Bouts

 Points

Round 2

Eight of the nine bouts were determined by fall. Five men stayed at 0 points, each having won both his bouts by fall. Two others were 2–0 after this round: Väli with 1 point and Dillen with 2 points. Five men were at 3 points (4 after a 1–1 start with win by fall and one at 0–1 with a bye). Kratochvíl had the distinction of being the remaining man with the highest point total, at 4. Six men were 0–2 and were eliminated.

 Bouts

 Points

Round 3

Of the five men who started the round with 0 points, only 1 finished it with that many: Quaglia, who had a bye. Kárpáti, Malmberg, and Steinig each won by decision, gaining their 1st point. Toivola lost. Väli stayed at 1 point, winning by fall. Dillen's first loss eliminated him, at 5 points after two wins by decision. Arıkan and Meyer won to stay in contention, each by fall to stay at 3 points. The other four men (Rey, Araujo, Kamel, and Dillen) who had a loss before this round lost again and were eliminated.

 Bouts

 Points

Round 4

Quaglia won his third bout by fall; along with his 3rd round bye, he stayed at 0 points. Väli also won a third bout by fall, making him 4–0 with 1 point as the other win came by decision. Malmberg and Steinig each picked up their 2nd point by winning by decision again, making them vulnerable to elimination upon any future loss. Kárpáti took his first loss, moving to 4 points. All three of the men who started the round with a prior loss lost again and were eliminated.

 Bouts

 Points

Round 5

Malmberg received a bye in this round, staying at 2 points. Kárpáti defeated Quaglia, but the bad points system led to the winner (who moved from 4 points to 5) being eliminated while the loser (from 0 points to 3) was not. Väli pinned Steinig to take the lead (at 1 point) and eliminate the latter wrestler.

 Bouts

 Points

Round 6

Väli was the only remaining wrestler who had not yet had a bye, so he got one in this round. Malmberg pinned Quaglia, staying in contention and eliminating the Italian with a bronze medal finish.

 Bouts

 Points

Round 7

Round 7 was effectively a gold medal match. Väli pinned Malmberg.

 Bouts

 Points

References

Wrestling at the 1928 Summer Olympics